The Rock Island Depot is located in Enid, Garfield County, Oklahoma and listed on the National Register of Historic Places since 1979.

History
The Rock Island Railway built rail lines through Oklahoma Territory prior to the Land Run of 1893. Skeleton Station was constructed in 1889. That same year, M.A. Low, upon a visit to the station, renamed the location Enid. When the Department of Interior moved the town site, this area became known as North Enid or Northington. During the run, the Rock Island transported settlers into the Cherokee Outlet, stopping only at this location.  Rock Island refused to stop at the new town site, and the Enid-Pond Creek Railroad War continued for a full year. A new depot was built in 1903. The current depot was constructed in 1928.

Building description

The building architecture is electric, showing both Spanish and Italian influences. The lower section of the exterior wall is brick, while there is covered with stucco. The stucco is painted white, decorated with tan painted trim. The center section has a gabled roof, with semicircular walls extending above the roof line on each end. The large window in the center is arched. Other windows have an arch design embedded in the stucco.

The building is single story and has 8 large rooms, for baggage handling, ticketing, waiting, and a covered concourse. Seven smaller rooms were for men's and women's restrooms and for storage. Since Oklahoma law required strict segregation of black and white passengers, there had to be two for each function.

The station is not now used by the railroad. It was used as a farmer's market on Saturdays during 2011.

References

Railway stations on the National Register of Historic Places in Oklahoma
Buildings and structures in Enid, Oklahoma
Railway stations in the United States opened in 1928
Enid
Former railway stations in Oklahoma
National Register of Historic Places in Garfield County, Oklahoma